A Reciprocal Access Agreement (RAA) (ja: 部隊間協力円滑化協定, Force-to-force Cooperation Facilitation Agreement) refers to a bilateral defense and security pacts between Japan and governments that provides shared military training and military operations. It is an agreement built to create a framework for the two cooperating countries to move their military force whenever required, and also provides a pathway for goods to be imported and exported from one country to the other through following the movement of visiting military forces.

RAAs have been established between Japan and Australia, as well as Japan and the United Kingdom. For Australia, the signing of a reciprocal access agreement has later been used to further strengthen ties with other countries like India and the United States, and to also renew old pacts like the Joint Declaration on Security Cooperation (JDSC).

History

Australia 
Discussions over signing of the Japan-Australia Reciprocal Access Agreement (ja: 日豪円滑化協定) began in 2014 and was to be the second significant security pact Japan has made with another country ever since the 1960 Status of Forces Agreement with the United States. It was signed during a virtual summit on 6 January 2022 by Japanese Prime Minister Fumio Kishida and Australian Prime Minister Scott Morrison after the former declined all overseas travel due to the increasing COVID-19 cases at the time.

The pact has since then risen in prominence against the recent geopolitical tension and increasing competition in the Indo-Pacific space. Japan and Australia have shared concerns over China's growing maritime activities in the South China Sea, along with the concerns over a potential conflict with the Chinese Communist Party. This was later excerbated by China's imposement of economic and diplomatic sanctions in response to Australia's call for promoting and inquiry into the origins of the COVID-19 virus.

On 22 October 2022, Prime Ministers Anthony Albanese of Australia and Kishida Fumio further used the RAA to revise an old pact known as the Joint Declaration on Security Cooperation (JDSC). The initial JDSC was signed back in 2007 and signed by Prime Ministers John Howard and Abe Shinzo, in part as a response to the growing security ties in the wake of the 9/11 Incident. It was initially a non-binding security agreement, but the revision has made it a binding treaty between the two countries, and has allowed a more efficient utilization of the RAA.

The Japan Australia RAA has also been used as a stepping stone to strengthen the ties between India and the United States, which formed an official grouping with Japan and Australia known as the Quadrilateral Security Dialogue, or simply "The Quad". This group was initially formed in 2004 after the Indian Ocean Tsunami of 2004. There was initially some discussion over forming joint military exercises between the four nations back in 2007, but that was later scrapped due to heavy criticism from China. This was later rectified in 2020, with the four nations holding their first joint military exercise. This was done in part due to the growing concerns over Beijing's actions in backing Moscow and their distancing from the West.

United Kingdom 
On 5 May 2022, during an in-person meeting in Downing Street, United Kingdom Prime Minister Boris Johnson and Kishida agreed to begin discussions over signing an agreement similar to the RAA between Australia and Japan. Similar to the original Japan Australia RAA, this was done to both ease the hosting of joint military exercises and to simplify the process of bringing troops from one country to another. In addition, this new agreement has allowed Japan to jointly develop a next-generation fighter jet. This would be the first time Japan has worked on a major military project with another country other than the United States.

On the 11 January 2023, Japanese Prime Minister Fumio Kishida and UK Prime Minister Rishi Sunak signed the Japan-UK Reciprocal Access Agreement (ja: 日英部隊間協力円滑化協定) during Kishida's visit to London that will allow both nations to deploy troops in each other's countries. The UK will be the first European country to have such a reciprocal access agreement with Japan, with the UK Government describing the pact as the most important of its type since the 1902 Anglo-Japanese Alliance.

France 
Along with this, on 20 January 2022, Japan had formed a similar Joint Statement to the RAA with France. This was done virtually by Japan's Minister of Foreign Affairs, Yoshimasa Hayashi, Japan's Minister of Defense, Nobuo Kishi, France's Minister for Europe and Foreign Affairs, Jean-Yves Le Drian, and France's Minister for Armed Forces, Florence Parly. Just like the RAA, this joint statement was formed to strengthen military cooperation in regards to defense and security, both in response to China's actions in the South China Sea and the threat of North Korea's advancing nuclear and missiles development.

References

Australia–Japan military relations
Bilateral relations of Australia
Bilateral relations of Japan
2020 in international relations
Military treaties